Scopula aemulata, the imitator wave, is a moth of the family Geometridae. It was described by George Duryea Hulst in 1896. It is found in the south-eastern United States (including Florida, Mississippi and South Carolina).

References

Moths described in 1896
aemulata
Endemic fauna of the United States
Moths of North America